Poggio Rusco railway station is a railway station serving Poggio Rusco, in the region of Lombardy, northern Italy.

It is located at the junction of the Verona–Bologna railway and the Suzzara–Ferrara railway. It is the terminus of Line S3 of Bologna metropolitan railway service.

Train services are operated by Trenitalia and Trenitalia Tper.

The station is managed by Rete Ferroviaria Italiana (RFI).

History 

The station was opened in 1888, when the Suzzara–Ferrara railway line was completed. It was located east of the town centre; the junction to the then projected Bologna–Verona railway line was already envisaged.

On 26 October 2008, the stretch from Poggio Rusco to San Felice sul Panaro railway station was double-tracked. A new alignment between Poggio Rusco and Nogara railway station was inaugurated on 14 December 2008.

Features
The station consists of 6 tracks.

Train services

The station is served by the following service(s):

 Suburban services (Treno suburbano) on line S3, Bologna - Poggio Rusco

See also

 List of railway stations in Lombardy
 Bologna metropolitan railway service

References 

Railway stations in Lombardy
Railway stations opened in 1888
1888 establishments in Italy
Railway stations in Italy opened in the 19th century